Wu-chi Liu (1907 – 3 October 2002) was a scholar of Chinese literature and writer. His works include editing Sunflower Splendor: Three Thousand Years of Chinese Poetry, an anthology of translated Chinese poetry widely used in teaching.

Biography
Wu-chi Liu was born in Shanghai, China in 1907. His father was Liu Yazi, a prominent literary leader and political activist. He moved to the United States in 1927, where he received a doctorate in English literature from Yale University in 1931. He returned to China in 1932 and taught at Nankai University, National Southwestern Associated University and National Central University (now Nanjing University), before again moving to the United States after World War II. In the United States, he taught Chinese literature, philosophy and drama at Rollins College, Yale University, the University of Pittsburgh and Indiana University, where he was the first chairman of the East Asian Languages and Literature department. Wu-chi Liu died in Menlo Park, California on 3 October 2002.

Works

 Su Man-shu, 1972. (biography of Su Manshu)
An Introduction to Chinese Literature. Greenwood Publishing Group, 1990. .
Sunflower Splendor: Three Thousand Years of Chinese Poetry
La philosophie de Confucius

References

Chinese literature
1907 births
2002 deaths
Writers from Shanghai
Academic staff of Nankai University
Academic staff of Nanjing University
Rollins College faculty
Yale University alumni
Yale University faculty
Indiana University faculty
University of Pittsburgh faculty
Academic staff of the National Southwestern Associated University
Lawrence University alumni